The Ambassador of the United Kingdom to Hungary is the United Kingdom's foremost diplomatic representative in Hungary, and head of the UK's diplomatic mission in Budapest.

Heads of mission

Austro-Hungarian Empire
During the Austro-Hungarian Empire, the United Kingdom was represented by an Ambassador in Vienna and a Consul-General at the Hungarian capital of Budapest.

Consul-General
 1899–1902 Conway Thornton
 1902–1903 Arthur James Herbert

Envoy Extraordinary and Minister Plenipotentiary to Hungary

 1921–1924 Thomas Hohler
 1924–1928 Sir Colville Barclay 
 1928–1933 Aretas Akers-Douglas, 2nd Viscount Chilston
 1933–1935 Sir Patrick Ramsay
 1935–1939 Geoffrey Knox
 1941–1947 No representation due to World War II
 1947–1949 Sir Knox Helm
 1949–1951 Sir Geoffrey Wallinger
 1951–1953 The Hon. Robert Hankey
 1953–1955 Sir George Labouchère
 1955–1959 Sir Leslie Fry
 1959–1961 Nicolas Cheetham
 1961–1963 Sir Ivor Pink

Ambassador Extraordinary and Plenipotentiary to Hungary

1963–1965 Sir Ivor Pink
1965–1967 Sir Alexander Morley
1967–1969 Sir Guy Millard
1970–1973 Derek Dodson
1973–1976 The Hon. John Wilson
1976–1979 Richard Parsons
1980–1983 Bryan Cartledge
1983–1986 Peter Unwin
1986–1989 Leonard Appleyard
1989–1995 Sir John Birch
1995–1998 Christopher Long
1998–2003 Nigel Thorpe
2003–2007 John Nichols
2007–2011 Gregory Dorey
2012–2015 Jonathan Knott
2015–2016 Theresa Bubbear (chargé d'affaires ad interim)
2016–2020 Iain Lindsay</onlyinclude>

 October 2020 Paul Fox

References

External links 
 UK in Hungary – British Embassy Budapest

 
United Kingdom
Hungary